The 1997 Australian Super Touring Championship was a CAMS sanctioned Australian motor racing title open to Super Touring Cars. It was the fifth national title to be run in Australia for Super Touring Cars and the third to carry the Australian Super Touring Championship name.  The championship, which was promoted by TOCA Australia as the 1997 BOC Gases Australian Super Touring Championship, began on 4 May at Lakeside International Raceway and ended on 9 November at Amaroo Park after eight rounds and sixteen races. The Drivers Championship was won by Paul Morris, the Manufacturers Championship by BMW and the Teams Championship by BMW Motorsport.

Teams and drivers
The following teams and drivers competed in the 1997 Australian Super Touring Championship. 

Note : * indicates entry nominated by a manufacturer for the Manufacturers Championship

Race calendar
The 1997 Australian Super Touring Championship was contested over eight rounds with two races held at each round.

Results

Drivers Championship
Drivers Championship points were awarded on a 15-12-10-8-6-5-4-3-2-1 basis for the first ten places in each race. One point was awarded to the driver setting the fastest qualifying time for each races.

Manufacturers Championship
Manufacturers Championship points were awarded on a 15-12-10 basis for relative positions attained in each race by the best placed car of each of the three manufacturers that had nominated cars to compete on their behalf.

Teams Championship

TOCA Challenge Cup - Independents

The TOCA Challenge Cup was open to drivers of teams which did not receive major support from a manufacturer.

See also
1997 AMP Bathurst 1000, a non-championship race for Super Touring cars.

References

External links
 Australian Titles at docs.cams.com.au as archived at web.archive.org
 Results Archive at www.natsoft.com.au
 Review and images from the Winton round of the Championship at www.minerva.com.au 
 1997 Australian Super Touring Championship Entry List at www.supertouringregister.com

Australian Super Touring Championship
Super Touring Car Championship